Claudinho, a diminutive form of the given name Claudio, may also refer to:

Claudinho (footballer, born 1967), born Cláudio Batista dos Santos, Brazilian football forward
Claudinho (footballer, born 1977), born Cláudio Rogério Almeida Cogo, Brazilian football left-back
Claudinho (footballer, born 1980), born Cláudio Roberto Siqueira Fernandes Filho, Brazilian football right-back
Claudinho (footballer, born 1981), born Claudio Luiz Jandre Sobrinho, Brazilian football midfielder
Claudinho (footballer, born May 1982), born Cláudio André Santos Assis, Brazilian football left midfielder
Claudinho (footballer, born November 1982), born Cláudio Wanderley Sarmento Neto, Brazilian football midfielder
Claudinho (footballer, born 1991), born Cláudio Pereira da Silva Júnior, Brazilian football forward for ABC
Claudinho (footballer, born 1997), born Cláudio Luiz Rodrigues Parise Leonel, Brazilian football attacking midfielder for Zenit Saint Petersburg
Claudinho (footballer, born 2000), born Cláudio Henrique Paiva Porfirio, Brazilian football forward for Cruzeiro

See also
Claudio (disambiguation)